Centroberyx spinoffs, the short alfonsino, is a species of ray-finned fish. It is found from the Storms River to off the coast of Durban, South Africa.

References

External links
 

Centroberyx
Marine fish of South Africa
Endemic fish of South Africa
Fish described in 1903